is the final entry in a series of six Japanese martial arts films based on the long-running Lone Wolf and Cub manga series about Ogami Ittō, a wandering assassin for hire who is accompanied by his young son, Daigoro. Although this is the last film in the series, it does not end the story or include the conclusion of the series as written in the manga.

Plot

After the Shogun threatens to disgrace the Yagyū clan because of their continual failure to kill the wandering swordsman Ogami Ittō and his infant son Daigoro, Lord Yagyū Retsudo sends his daughter and last remaining child Kaori, an expert with flying daggers, to kill them. After she is killed, Retsudo attempts to use the Tsuchigumo, a secretive mountain clan that practices black magic and is commanded by Hyouei, an illegitimate son of Retsudo who is determined to cause the downfall of the Yagyū by killing Ittō and Daigoro himself. Hyouei sends his three most fearsome followers, whose abilities include the ability to burrow through the earth and who kill anyone Ittō and Daigoro come into contact with.

Ittō soon confronts and defeats Hyouei in sword combat along with all of his men. Fleeing to the mountains of northern Japan, Ittō turns the tables on the three Tsuchigumo who cannot burrow under snow and ice and kills all three of them as well.

The story culminates in a final battle between Ittō and the combined Japanese clan groups, numbering nearly 1,000 men, under Retsudo's personal command on a snow-capped mountain, in which the baby cart becomes a sled. Ittō once again uses the baby cart's weapons first by gunning down a third of the army with the baby cart's gattling machine gun, then using the cart's weapons which Ittō ends up shooting, stabbing, slashing, dismembering and beheading the entire army. But the one-eyed Retsudo once again escapes by riding away on a sled, vowing to kill Ittō another day.

Cast
 Tomisaburo Wakayama as Ogami Ittō
 Akihiro Tomikawa as Daigoro
 Junko Hitomi as Yagyū Kaori
 Isao Kimura as Yagyū Hyouei
 Gorō Mutsumi as Ishine Kokaku
 Minoru Ōki as Yagyū Retsudo

Release
Lone Wolf and Cub: White Heaven in Hell was released theatrically in Japan on 24 April 1974. The film was released on home video in the United States as Lone Wolf and Cub - White Heaven in Hell by Samurai Cinema, a division of AnimEigo, Inc. The film was later released by the Criterion Collection on DVD and Blu-ray on November 8, 2016.

See also
 List of Japanese films of 1974

References

Footnotes

Sources

External links

1974 films
Live-action films based on manga
1970s Japanese-language films
6
Japanese martial arts films
Japanese sequel films
Toho films
1974 martial arts films
Films set in the Edo period
1970s Japanese films